Laisenia Katonawale known also as Laisenia Kato (Saunaka, Nadi, 14 November 1966-Sydney, 13 January 2019) was a Fijian former rugby union footballer, he played as flanker.

Career
He played for the Saunaka village team, with which he won several tournaments in the country, and for the Nadi district team, with which he won the Farebrother-Sullivan Trophy in 1991. He played as blindside and openside flanker. In 1987 he was the first player from the Saunaka village to play for World XV. 

He debuted in a test match against Tonga, in Suva, on 8 June 1991. Katonawale also played in the 1991 Rugby World Cup for the Fiji national team, playing all the three pool stage matches in the tournament. He retired from the international career after the 1991 Rugby World Cup, Later he played for the Suva District team and for Beecroft club from Sydney in 1997, winning the Paul Wharton Trophy as one of the best players of the team. After terminating his career, he worked for the Australian branch of Foxconn.

Katonawale died on 13 January 2019, he is survived by his wife and his three children, of which, Peceli, who became a rugby player for the Nadi district team.

Notes

External links

Fiji international rugby union players
Fijian rugby union players
Rugby union flankers
1966 births
Sportspeople from Nadi
2019 deaths
Fijian expatriates in Australia
I-Taukei Fijian people